Archaeohyracidae is an extinct family of notoungulate mammals known from the Paleocene through the Oligocene of South America.

References 

Typotheres
Paleocene mammals
Eocene mammals
Oligocene mammals
Paleocene first appearances
Chattian extinctions
Prehistoric mammal families
Polyphyletic groups